Oh Chang-hyeon (born 2 March 1993) is a South Korean football midfielder who plays for Seongnam FC in K League Challenge.

Club career

Pohang Steelers
Oh joined Pohang Steelers in 2016. In 2015 season he didn't play any game because of his frequent injuries. On 12 June 2016, Oh finally made his league debut against Jeonnam Dragons at Gwangyang Football Stadium. In this match, Oh played 33 minutes after he was substituted for Hwang Ji-soo. On 29 June 2016, Oh scored his first professional goal in the Donghaean derby with Ulsan Hyundai. In the match, Pohang won by 4–0.

International career 
He has been a member of the South Korea national U-20 team since 2014. In 2014, he played in 2014 Toulon Tournament.

Club career statistics

References

External links

1993 births
Living people
Association football midfielders
South Korean footballers
Pohang Steelers players
Seongnam FC players
K League 1 players
K League 2 players
Dankook University alumni